The Methodist Manse is a historic house at Spring and Main Streets in Canehill, Arkansas.  Built in 1834, this single-story brick structure served as the town's first Methodist church building, and was converted to its minister's house when the new wood-frame church was built in the 1850s.  It is one of the community's most significant pre-Civil War buildings.

The house was listed on the National Register of Historic Places in 1982.

See also
National Register of Historic Places listings in Washington County, Arkansas

References

Houses on the National Register of Historic Places in Arkansas
Houses completed in 1834
Houses in Washington County, Arkansas
National Register of Historic Places in Washington County, Arkansas
Churches on the National Register of Historic Places in Arkansas
Methodist churches in Arkansas
1834 establishments in Arkansas Territory
Churches in Washington County, Arkansas
Federal architecture
Clergy houses in the United States